This is a list of lists of African Union members:

 List of African Union member states by political system
 Member states of the African Union (may be sorted by name, population, area etc.)